Fereydunabad may refer to:
 Fereydunabad, Chaharmahal and Bakhtiari